Dominic Hawksley is a British actor who appeared in Death Machine and Entropy. His voice work includes Midnight Club: Street Racing, Midnight Club 2, and the Max Payne wherein he appears in the first game as the mob leader Vladimir Lem. and in the documentary film The Endurance: Shackleton's Legendary Antarctic Expedition. He has also featured in numerous radio dramas and comedies for BBC Radio 4 including The Hitchhiker's Guide to the Galaxy, The Glittering Prizes  and Life of Penguins.

Filmography

References

External links
 

Place of birth missing (living people)
Year of birth missing (living people)
Living people
British male film actors
British male radio actors